Postplatyptilia is a genus of moths in the family Pterophoridae.

Species
Postplatyptilia aestuosa 
Postplatyptilia akerbergsi 
Postplatyptilia alexisi 
Postplatyptilia antillae 
Postplatyptilia biobioica 
Postplatyptilia boletus 
Postplatyptilia camptosphena 
Postplatyptilia carchi  
Postplatyptilia caribica  
Postplatyptilia corticus  
Postplatyptilia drechseli  
Postplatyptilia eelkoi 
Postplatyptilia flinti 
Postplatyptilia fuscicornis 
Postplatyptilia genisei 
Postplatyptilia huigraica 
Postplatyptilia machupicchu 
Postplatyptilia naranja 
Postplatyptilia nebuloarbustum 
Postplatyptilia nielseni 
Postplatyptilia nubleica 
Postplatyptilia palmeri 
Postplatyptilia paraglyptis 
Postplatyptilia parana 
Postplatyptilia pluvia  
Postplatyptilia pusillus 
Postplatyptilia saeva 
Postplatyptilia sandraella 
Postplatyptilia seitetazas  
Postplatyptilia talcaica 
Postplatyptilia transversus  
Postplatyptilia triangulocosta 
Postplatyptilia ugartei  
Postplatyptilia uruguayensis  
Postplatyptilia vorbecki  
Postplatyptilia zongoensis 

 
Platyptiliini
Moth genera